Saad Salman (born 1950, in Baghdad, Iraq)  is an Iraqi-French film director. He filmed Baghdad On/Off, a documentary filmed when Saddam Hussein was in power. He has been exiled in Paris since 1976. He attended a School of the Art schools of Baghdad in 1969, he later left Iraq for Lebanon in 1974 but had to leave because of the civil war taking place at the time, forcing him to settle in Paris in 1976.

Filmography
 2003 - Baghdad On/Off
 1983 - En raison des circonstances

References

External links

Saad Salman at MTV movies

Interview with Saad Salman

1950 births
Living people
Iraqi film directors
French people of Iraqi descent
French people of Lebanese descent
People from Baghdad